Cynthia Shelley (born 23 March 1960 in Barnet, Hertfordshire) is an English actress, known for her roles in two BBC television dramas of the 1980s: Alice Courtenay in Tenko and Abby Urquhart in Howards' Way.

Career
Shelley made her television debut playing Rhiannon, one of the party girls in The Young Ones episode "Interesting". A week later, she played the girl on the radio in the "Flood" episode of the same series.

Shelley played Alice Courtenay in the World War II-set series Tenko. Shelley appeared in nine episodes of series three and appeared in Tenko Reunion  the following year. From 1985 to 1990, she was a regular cast member for six series of Howards' Way in the role of Abby Urquhart/Hudson.

Shelley later made appearances The Tripods, Bottom, Men Behaving Badly, A Prince Among Men and Grange Hill.

She replaced Charlotte Long for the second series of The Tripods'' after Long's sudden death in a road accident.

References

External links

http://www.zetaminor.com/cult/howards_way/howards_way_cast.htm
http://www.bbc.co.uk/cult/classic/tripods/index.shtml
http://users.bestweb.net/~foosie/tenkocst.htm
http://www.sitcom.co.uk/young_ones/

1960 births
People from Chipping Barnet
English television actresses
Living people
Actresses from Hertfordshire